Sir Tristan Venus Antico, AC (25 March 192326 December 2004), was a prominent Australian industrialist, horse breeder, and patron of the arts.

Antico was born in Poivene, Italy, immigrating with his family to Australia aged seven. He attended Sydney Boys High School.
 
In 1954 Antico bought Pioneer Readymix. In 1959 it was listed on the Sydney Stock Market. In 1967 Italy made Antico a Commander of the Order of the Star of Italian Solidarity. He was knighted in 1973 and was appointed a Companion of the Order of Australia in 1983.

He was chairman of St Vincent's Hospital.

References

Companions of the Order of Australia
Australian Knights Bachelor
Businesspeople awarded knighthoods
20th-century Australian businesspeople
21st-century Australian businesspeople
Italian emigrants to Australia
People educated at Sydney Boys High School
1923 births
2004 deaths